von Below is a German surname. Notable people with the surname include:

  (1801–1882), landowner, member of the Reichstag and member of the Prussian House of Lords
  (1808-1896), prussian lieutenant general
  (1866-1939), german diplomat
Eduard von Below (1856-1942), World War I general
Ernst von Below (1863–1955), World War I general
Fritz von Below (1853–1918), World War I general
  (1858-1927), german constitutional and economic historian
  (1838-1892), prussian lieutenant general
Gerd-Paul von Below (1892–1953), World War II general
  (1894-1975), german female writer
  (1791–1852), prussian lieutenant general 
Gustav von Below (1790–1843), pomeranian squire and pietist, founder of 
  (1862-1933), World War I general
Nicolaus von Below (1907–1983), adjutant of Adolf Hitler
  (1837-1919), german politician
Otto von Below (1857–1944), World War I general
 Paul von Below (1880-1943), a renowned german horseman
  (1879–1925), german artist and illustrator

German-language surnames
Below family